The Haw Lantern (1987) is a collection of poems written by Irish poet Seamus Heaney, the recipient of the Nobel Prize in Literature in 1995. Several of the poems—including the sonnet cycle "Clearances"—explore themes of mortality and loss inspired by the death of his mother, Margaret Kathleen Heaney (the "M.K.H." referenced in the dedication to "Clearances"), who died in 1984 and of his father two years later.

The title of the collection refers to the haw fruit. The fruit is an important symbol of defiance against winter, a symbol of, the dignity of the Northern Irish in the face of violence and trouble, and offering a small piece of light and hope in the darkness.  The image of the lantern evoked by the title is a reference to the traditional account of the Greek cynic philosopher Diogenes of Sinope. According to the story, Diogenes carried a lantern through the streets in search of an honest man in the light.

Contents 

 Alphabets
 Terminus
 From the Frontier of Writing
 The Haw Lantern
 The Stone Grinder
 A Daylight Art
 Parable Island
 From the Republic of Conscience
 Hailstones
 Two Quick Notes
 The Stone Verdict
 From the Land of the Unspoken
 A Ship of Death
 The Spoonbait
 In Memoriam: Robert Fitzgerald
 The Old Team
 Clearances: In Memoriam M.K.H.
 Clearances 1
 Clearances 2
 Clearances 3
 Clearances 4
 Clearances 5
 Clearances 6
 Clearances 7
 Clearances 8
 The Milk Factory
 The Summer of Lost Rachel
 The Wishing Tree
 A Postcard from Iceland
 A Peacock's Feather
 Grotus and Coventina
 Holding Course
 The Song of the Bullets
 Wolfe Tone
 A Shooting Script
 From the Canton of Expectation
 The Mud Vision
 The Disappearing Island
 The Riddle

See also
 Seamus Heaney Collected Poems

References

1987 poetry books
Irish poetry collections
Poetry by Seamus Heaney
Faber and Faber books